The RFU Intermediate Cup is a rugby union national knockout cup competition in England run by the Rugby Football Union. It is contested by teams at level 7 of the English rugby union system. While the competition is a national one, it is however split into regions until the semi-finals with the final being held at Twickenham Stadium in London. It was first contested in 1997. Presently, the RFU Intermediate Cup is the third most important club cup competition in England, behind the Premiership Rugby Cup and RFU Championship Cup.

History 
The RFU Intermediate Cup was first contested in 1997 for clubs at Level 7 of English rugby. The competition was initially unsponsored but later gained sponsorship from NPI, Powergen and EDF Energy before becoming known as the "RFU Intermediate Cup" solely un-sponsored by 2008. The largest crowd for a final was set in 2016 for the match between Kent based Tunbridge Wells RFC and Cumbria's St. Benedict's where 9,000 Tunbridge Wells fans attended the final. A number of future RFU Championship clubs have played in the RFU Intermediate Cup prior to promotion to the second tier with Jersey Reds, Hartpury College, Doncaster Knights and Richmond all taking part in the past.

Current format

The rounds are contested on a regional basis between the four regional unions until the semi-finals, where the winner of each region enters the national competition. Each region decides their representative separately. For example, London and South East use a direct knockout competition of all teams in the region while South West split their region into Southern Counties and South Western Counties with the winners playing each other to be the region's representative. Each regional champion plays another set champion with the ground being one of the semi-finalist's home. The semi-finals pairings are London & South East against South West and Midlands against North. The winners of the semis play each other in the final at Twickenham Stadium.

North

The format for northern teams involved in the RFU Intermediate Cup is a league-cup hybrid with each county union in the region selecting one representative each.  The first stage features a mini league with clubs from Cheshire, Cumbria and Lancashire meeting in one pool and clubs from Durham County, Northumberland and Yorkshire, meeting in the other, each side playing 2 games each.  The winners of each group then meet in the north final to determine who goes forward to the national semi-finals. The competition involves representative teams from the following level 7 leagues:

Cumbria 1
Durham/Northumberland 1
Lancs/Cheshire 1 
Yorkshire 1

Midlands

The format for Midlands teams involved in the RFU Senior Vase is a direct knockout cup with a 1st round, 2nd round, 3rd round, semi-finals and final.  The winner of the final goes forward to the Senior Vase national semi-finals. The competition involves all teams from the following level 7 leagues:

Midlands 2 West (North)
Midlands 2 West (South)
Midlands 2 East (North)
Midlands 2 East (South)

London and South East

As with the Midlands the format for London and South East teams involved in the RFU Senior Vase is a direct knockout cup with a 1st round, 2nd round, 3rd round, semi-finals and final.  The winner of the final goes forward to the Senior Vase national semi-finals. The competition involves all teams from the following level 7 leagues:

London 2 North East
London 2 North West
London 2 South East
London 2 South West

South West

The format for the south-west teams is more complex with different methods of qualification decided on by the county unions that they represent.  Clubs that are affiliated with Dorset & Wilts and Gloucestershire play in county based knock-out competitions first.  The winners of the Dorset & Wilts competition then plays in the Southern Counties semi-finals against representatives from Berkshire, Buckinghamshire and Oxfordshire, while the Gloucestershire winners play in the South West Counties semi-finals against representative from Cornwall, Devon and Somerset, with the winners then meeting in a regional final.  Finally, the Southern Counties and South West Counties winners meet to determine qualification for the national semi-finals. Teams involved are from the following level 7 leagues:

Southern Counties North 
Southern Counties South
Counties 1 Western North
Counties 1 Western West

Competition results

Number of wins

Club

Aldwinians (1)
Bedford Athletic (1)
Bradford & Bingley (1)
Brighton (1)
Camberley (1)
Chester (1)
Dunstablians (1)
East Grinstead (1)
Halifax (1)
Hartpury College (1)
Hertford (1)
Kenilworth (1)
Maidstone (1)
Morley (1)
Mounts Bay (1)
Old Patesians (1)
Old Redcliffians (1)
Stockport (1)
Stoke-on-Trent (1)
Thanet Wanderers (1)
Trowbridge (1)
Tunbridge Wells (1)
West Leeds (1)

Region
London & South East (7) 
North (7)
South West (5)
Midlands (4)

Notes

See also
 Anglo-Welsh Cup
 EDF Energy Trophy
 Premiership Rugby Cup
 RFU Championship Cup
 RFU Senior Vase
 RFU Junior Vase
 Rugby union in England

References

External links
 RFU

Rugby union competitions in England
Rugby union cup competitions in England
Recurring sporting events established in 1997
1997 establishments in England